Cristina Bucșa and Bibiane Schoofs defeated Olga Danilović and Alexandra Panova in the final, 7–6(7–5), 6–3 to win the doubles tennis title at the 2023 WTA Lyon Open.

Laura Siegemund and Vera Zvonareva were the reigning champions,  but chose not to participate this year.

Seeds

Draw

Draw

References
Main draw

2023 WTA Tour
2023 WTA Lyon Open - 2